Binta Zahra Diop (born 30 June 1990 in Dakar) is a Senegalese swimmer, who specialized in butterfly events. She is also a two-time bronze medalist for the 50 m butterfly event at the All-Africa Games.

Diop represented Senegal at the 2008 Summer Olympics in Beijing, and competed for the women's 100 m butterfly event. She won the first heat, with a time of 1:04.26. Diop, however, failed to advance into the semi-final rounds, as she placed forty-seventh in the overall rankings.

References

External links
NBC Olympics Profile

Senegalese female swimmers
Living people
Olympic swimmers of Senegal
Swimmers at the 2008 Summer Olympics
Female butterfly swimmers
Sportspeople from Dakar
1990 births
African Games bronze medalists for Senegal
African Games medalists in swimming
Competitors at the 2007 All-Africa Games
Competitors at the 2011 All-Africa Games